Peritoma was a genus in the plant family Cleomaceae with six species of shrubs and annuals, but is now considered synonymous with Cleomella. All six species are native to North America, concentrated mostly in southern California, and with large populations in the rest of the western United States and northwestern Mexico. The name "Peritoma" is derived from the Ancient Greek words "peri" (περί), meaning "about" or "around," and "toma" or "tome" (τομή), meaning "cut." The name "cut-around" refers to the calyx that splits around its middle as the fruit dehisces.

Species 

 Peritoma arborea
 Peritoma arborea var. angustata
 Peritoma arborea var. arborea
 Peritoma arborea var. globosa
 Peritoma jonesii
 Peritoma lutea
 Peritoma platycarpa
 Peritoma serrulata

References 

Cleomaceae
Brassicales genera